Tighnabruaich Lifeboat Station is located in the Kyles of Bute. It has been in use for nearly 40 years. The inshore lifeboat carries out rescues mainly to leisure craft. The station is the base for Royal National Lifeboat Institution (RNLI) search and rescue operations at Tighnabruaich, Argyll, United Kingdom. It operates an Atlantic 85 inshore Lifeboat (ILB).

Fleet

References 

Lifeboat stations in Scotland
Kyles of Bute
Water transport in Scotland